Events in the year 1779 in Norway.

Incumbents
Monarch: Christian VII

Events
23 November - Magnus Theiste was sentenced by the Supreme Court to be removed from his office as County Governor of Nordre Bergenhus amt, because of his involvement with corruption.

Arts and literature

Births

12 February – Jens Jensen Gram, jurist and politician (died 1824).
10 August – Carl Rønneberg, merchant and ship owner (died 1858).
27 August – Hovel Helseth, industrial pioneer (died 1865).
19 September – Valentin Christian Wilhelm Sibbern, government minister (died 1853).
21 September (in France) – Johan Caspar Herman Wedel-Jarlsberg, politician and nobleman (died 1840).
29 September – Fredrik Meltzer, businessman and politician (died 1855).
2 November – Frederik Motzfeldt, politician (died 1848).
8 November – Wollert Konow, merchant and vice consul (died 1839).

Full date unknown
Peder Paulsen Balke, farmer and politician (died 1840).
Anders Hansen Grønneberg, farmer and politician (died 1819).

Deaths

5 January – Niels Thaaning, painter (born c.1732).

Full date unknown
Gottfried Heinrich Gloger, organ builder (born 1710).

See also

References